"Notion" is a song recorded by American rock band Kings of Leon. The song was released as the fourth single (fifth in Australia) from their album, Only by the Night, on June 29, 2009. The song reached number one on the Billboard Alternative Songs chart for one week in of September 2009.

Chart performance

On the Canadian Hot 100, the song peaked at number 52.

Despite heavy radio play on BBC Radio 1, the song missed the UK Singles Chart Top 100 and peaked at #107, the first time the band had missed the UK Top 100 for a single.

The song has peaked at number 46 on the Australian ARIA Charts and has also become a radio hit there peaking at number 6 on the Australian Airplay charts.

Music video
A music video was shot as a promotional effort for the single and was released on June 1, 2009. The director was Phil Griffin. It captures the band performing in a dimly-lit, debris-filled room with imploding fiery brick walls adjacent to an alleyway bordered by another brick barrier that is used by the lead singer in a manner suggestive of the Wailing Wall in Jerusalem.

Track listing
iTunes Download
 "Notion" - 3:00
 "Notion" (Live in Amsterdam) - 3:01

Australian exclusive EP (physical)
 "Notion" - 3:00
 "Beneath The Surface" - 2:49
 "Sex On Fire" (Live From Cologne) - 3:31
 "Notion" (Live in Amsterdam) - 3:01
 "The Bucket" (CSS Remix) - 3:44

Charts

Certifications

References

External links

2008 songs
2009 singles
Kings of Leon songs
Song recordings produced by Jacquire King